Joseph Oscar Albert Sabourin (August 9, 1897 – September 20, 1937) was a professional ice hockey player from Ottawa. He played with the Saskatoon Crescents of the Western Canada Hockey League during the 1922–23 season. He died in Detroit, Michigan in 1937.

References

External links

1897 births
1937 deaths
Canadian ice hockey defencemen
Ice hockey people from Ottawa
Saskatoon Sheiks players
Western Canada Hockey League players